is a Japanese comedian, actor, voice actor and television presenter. He performs boke (he does not entirely do boke he is known for doing tsukkomi) and tells stories in the comedy duo Bananaman. His partner is Yūki Himura. He is also a former Seibu Railway employee.

Life and career
Osamu Shitara (設樂統) was born April 23, 1973 in Minano, Saitama as the youngest sibling of a brother and sister who are 6 and 3 years older respectively. He attended the Minano-chō Tachi Minano Middle School and was the president of the student council and the captain of the school baseball team. Shitara graduated high school in March, 1992 and found a job with Seibu Railway at the connection of his father who is a manager at Seibu Nagatoro Hotel, an establishment of the company. He worked at the Kotesashi Station on the Seibu Ikebukuro Line for 6 months before switching to other various part-time jobs and then finally becoming a comedian as a student of Masayuki Watanabe, whom he worked as a driver for.

In October, 1993, Shitara met up with three other rookie comedians in Shinjuku and formed a comedy group, Yūki Himura is one of them. However, after a few practice sessions, Shitara believed that a four man group would be limiting to their potential, and left with Himura to form what a comedy duo named Bananaman.

Shitara met his girlfriend when he was 19 at a part-time job and married her in 1999. They have 2 daughters as of 2019.

In the year 2012, Shitara appeared on more television programs than any other Japanese personality, appearing in 611 programs, 163 with Himura (Himura was ranked 12th with 428 television appearances). Shitara also led the rankings for the first half of 2013.

Filmography
To see his appearances as part of Bananaman, see Bananaman (comedy duo)

TV programmes

Films

Japanese dub

Stage

Advertisements

Video games

Music videos, others

References

External links

Japanese comedians
Japanese male actors
Japanese television personalities
Japanese television presenters
People from Saitama Prefecture
1973 births
Living people